Metasequoia occidentalis is an extinct redwood species of the family Cupressaceae that is found as fossils throughout the Northern Hemisphere. It is one of three extinct species of Metasequoia that are currently recognized as valid.

History
The species was first described in 1863 from fossils found in the outcrops of the Late Paleocene-Middle Eocene Chuckanut Formation around Birch Bay, Washington.  The species was originally described as Taxodium occidentale by John Strong Newberry.  Fossilized Metasequoia-like remains were noted in Europe and North America from the 1800s on, but were assigned to the cupressaceous genera Sequoia (redwoods) and Taxodium (bald cypresses). It was not until the living species Metasequoia glyptostroboides was discovered and described from a remote area of China during the 1940s, that the affinity of many of the fossils became apparent. In 1951, the species was reassigned to Metasequoia as M. occidentalis by Ralph Works Chaney based on the close resemblance to living Metasequoia. With a few notable exceptions, it has been claimed that the majority of the fossils documented in the literature show that M. occidentalis was identical to a live Metasequoia glyptostroboides.

Description

Like living Metasequoia, M. occidentalis was deciduous. The foliage consists of branchlets with oppositely arranged leaves.

Age and distribution

Metasequoia occidentalis appeared in fossil record during the Late Cretaceous epoch (Cenomanian stage). By the Tertiary period, it had become a major constituent of lowland and swampy forests in the northern circum-Pacific and polar regions, where it commonly coexisted with Glyptostrobus europaeus. Fossils assignable to M. occidentalis have been reported from parts of the United States, Canada, Russia, China, Japan, Greenland and Svalbard, but Metasequoia appears to have been rare or absent in much of Europe.

References

occidentalis
Prehistoric plants
Allenby Formation
Chu Chua Formation
Horsefly Shales
Klondike Mountain Formation
Tranquille Formation